Sechrest is a surname. Notable people with the surname include:

Donald Sechrest (1933–2006), American golfer and golf course architect
Jason Sechrest (born 1979), American writer and actor
Larry J. Sechrest (1946–2008), American economist
Lee Sechrest (1929–2015), American psychologist